Polish poetry has a centuries-old history, similar to the Polish literature.

Prominent Polish poets include
Marcin Bielski (1495–1575); Polish historian, chronicler, writer and Renaissance satirical poet, first to use Polish, hence his designation as the father of Polish prose
Mikołaj Rej (1505–1569); first Polish author to write exclusively in Polish and described as a "father of Polish literature"
Jan Kochanowski (1530–1584); commonly regarded as the greatest Polish poet before Adam Mickiewicz
 (1540–1599); royal secretary, poet and historian. He wrote in Polish and Latin. Son of Marcin Bielski.
Adam Mickiewicz (1798–1855); regarded as one of the Three Bards of Polish Romantic literature and a "national poet" in Poland, Lithuania and Belarus
Juliusz Słowacki (1809–1849); regarded as one of the Three Bards of Polish Romantic literature
Zygmunt Krasiński (1812–1859); regarded as one of the Three Bards of  Polish Romantic literature
Cyprian Norwid (1821–1883); regarded as a "national poet" in Poland
Maria Konopnicka (1842–1910)
Antoni Lange (1863–1929)
Adam Asnyk (1838–1897)
Bolesław Leśmian (1877–1937)
Jan Lechoń (1899–1956)
Julian Tuwim (1894–1953)
Maria Pawlikowska-Jasnorzewska (1891–1945)
Jarosław Iwaszkiewicz (1894–1980)
 Czesław Miłosz (1911–2004); Nike Award (1998), Nobel Prize in Literature (1980), Neustadt International Prize for Literature (1978)
Wisława Szymborska (1923–2012); Goethe Prize (1991), Herder Prize (1995), Nobel Prize in Literature (1996), Order of the White Eagle (2011)
Zbigniew Herbert (1924–1998)
Julia Hartwig (1921–2017)
Adam Zagajewski (1945–2021)

See also
List of famous Polish poems
List of Polish-language poets
Sapphic stanza in Polish poetry
Skamander
Sung poetry

References

 
Poetry by country